Johnlonginae is an extinct subfamily of sand shark with two genera: Johnlongia and Pseudomegachasma. The latter genus is thought to have evolved from former. They are among the older sand sharks, and are only known from the Cretaceous period.

References 

Cretaceous sharks
Odontaspididae
Prehistoric animal subfamilies
Fish subfamilies
Fossil taxa described in 2015